Keith Kelvin Deller (born 24 December 1959) is an English former professional darts player best known for winning the 1983 BDO World Darts Championship and Unipart British Professional Championship in 1987. He was the first qualifier ever to win the championship and remains one of the youngest champions in history. For his world championship win, Deller used 18-gram spring-loaded darts, later banned for tournament play but now legal again.

Career

BDO
Deller's victory over Eric Bristow in the 1983 BDO World Darts Championship by 6 sets to 5 was probably the biggest upset in the history of the championship. He had also beaten world number 3 John Lowe in the quarter finals and defending champion and world number 2 Jocky Wilson in the semi-final to become the only player in history to defeat the world's top three ranked players in the World Championship. The tabloid headlines the following day were "Killed Three", an anagram of his name. The champion's prize money in 1983 was £8,000.

His checkout of 138 to clinch the trophy is amongst the most memorable in darting history. Bristow had left himself 50 to stay in the match, but decided to throw for single 18 with his last dart to leave double 16 instead of a more difficult attempt at the bullseye. Deller then hit treble 20, treble 18, double 12 for the title, and even to this day commentators often refer to 138 as the "Deller checkout" if a player is left with that score.

Despite a meteoric rise to World Champion, his career results failed to maintain that level. On the defence of his world title, he lost in the first round to Nicky Virachkul, and he only won three further matches in the BDO World Championship in subsequent years. He did win the British Professional Championship in 1987, but generally his world ranking continued to fall, and he even failed to qualify for the World Championship between 1989 and 1993. One of his more notable achievements in the years following his world title win is his 100.30 average in his quarter-final match against John Lowe in the 1985 World Championship; this made him the first-ever player to record a three-figure average in a BDO world championship match.

PDC

Deller was one of the players who broke away from the British Darts Organisation in 1992 and joined the WDC, now the PDC. This saw him gain some more television exposure, and he did produce a few resurgent performances to reach the semi finals of the 1998 PDC World Championship and also the semi finals of the 1998 PDC World Matchplay. Deller dropped out of the top 32 of the PDC's World Rankings around 2005 and therefore had to attempt qualification for their major tournaments – which he failed to do for the 2006, 2007 and 2008 PDC World Championships. He now competes much less on the circuit, including around half-a-dozen UK Open Regional events during 2007; he has preferred to perform in more lucrative exhibition matches with fellow legend players such as Bristow and Lowe.

Records
Deller's name has been in the record books on a couple of occasions. He held the Guinness World Record for the fastest 3 legs of 301 in 97 seconds. On 13 October 1984 he was on the wrong end of a piece of darting history when Lowe hit the first-ever televised nine-dart finish against him in the quarter-finals of the MFI World Matchplay. He became the first player to achieve a match average of 100 in a BDO World Championship match; he did, however, lose the game to Lowe. 

On 7 August 2012 Deller recorded a 25 second 301, checking out 130 on the bullseye for a new world record time. This beat the record of 33 seconds by Dean Gould, recorded earlier on the same day at the same venue, the Olympia Great British Beer Festival.

Spotter
Deller has for many years been part of the Sky Sports broadcasting team acting as a "spotter" for the cameras. His knowledge of the players and scoring shots helps the director and cameramen anticipate where the next dart will be thrown.

Personal life
Deller supports his local football club Ipswich Town F.C.

World Championship performances

BDO
 1983: Winner (beat Eric Bristow 6–5) 
 1984: First round (lost to Nicky Virachkul 1–2)
 1985: Quarter-final (lost to John Lowe 2–4)
 1986: Second round (lost to Alan Glazier 1–3)
 1987: First round (lost to Brian Cairns 0–3)
 1988: First round (lost to John Lowe 1–3)

PDC
 1994: Group Stage (lost to Steve Brown 1–3 and Kevin Spiolek 1–3)
 1995: Group Stage (lost to Larry Butler 2–3 and Kevin Spiolek 1–3)
 1996: Quarter-finals (lost to Phil Taylor 0–4)
 1997: Quarter-finals (lost to Phil Taylor 1–5)
 1998: Semi-finals (lost to Dennis Priestley 1–5 and lost the third place match to Rod Harrington 1–4)
 1999: First round (lost to Bob Anderson 2–3)
 2000: Second round (lost to John Lowe 1–3)
 2001: Quarter-finals (lost to Phil Taylor 0–4)
 2002: First round (lost to Rod Harrington 3–4)
 2003: Second round (lost to Richie Burnett 3–4)
 2004: Third round (lost to Peter Manley 2–4)
 2005: Second round (lost to Wayne Jones 1–3)

WSDT
 2022: Second round (lost to Larry Butler 2–3)
 2023: Second round (lost to Neil Duff 0–3)

Performance timeline

References

External links
Keith Deller's profile and stats on Darts Database
Video Clip of John Lowe's 9 dart finish v Keith Deller

English darts players
BDO world darts champions
1959 births
Living people
Sportspeople from Ipswich
Professional Darts Corporation founding players
Darts people